Hiro was an Italian television channel, owned by television network Mediaset. Aimed to a children and teens viewership, was launched in 2008 as part of Mediaset Premium pay television network. The channel was devoted to broadcasting anime programming. The last announcer of the channel was Italian voice actor Claudio Moneta.

Since August 1, 2011 to March 31, 2013 the channel was transmitted only on line by Premium Net TV, with the service on demand. Hiro was later shut down.

Programming
 Arriva Cristina
 Bratz
 Cristina
 Cri Cri
 Cristina, l'Europa siamo noi
 Shin Megami Tensei: Devil Children
 Dragon Ball
 Dragon Ball Z
 Dragon Ball GT
 Naruto
 Naruto Shippuden
 Kilari
 Onegai My Melody
 Pokémon
 Princess Sara
 Esper Mami
 The Prince of Tennis
 Shugo Chara!
 Huckleberry Finn Monogatari
 Hunter × Hunter
 Dr. Slump
 Jewelpet
 Baby and Me
 Akubi Girl
 Sailor Moon
 Doraemon
 Cyborg Kuro-chan
 Sgt. Frog
 Mermaid Melody Pichi Pichi Pitch
 Ai Shite Knight
 Anne of Green Gables
 Nobody's Boy: Remi
 Heidi
 3000 Leagues in Search of Mother
 Ojamajo Doremi
 Beyblade
 Biker Mice from Mars
 Space Warrior Baldios
 The Adventures of Piccolino
 Belphegor
 Belle and Sebastian
 Maya the Bee
 Captain Tsubasa
 Potatoes and Dragons
 Saint Seiya
 One Piece
 Twin Princesses of the Wonder Planet
 Minky Momo
 Bratz
 Trollz
 Marsupilami
 Crayon Shin-chan
 Tokyo Mew Mew
 Yu-Gi-Oh!
 Hamtaro
 Vicky the Viking
 Idol Densetsu Eriko
 Ohayō! Spank
 Detective Conan
 Chrono Crusade
 Cardcaptor Sakura
 Dinosaur King
 Magical Angel Sweet Mint
 He-Man and the Masters of the Universe
 Iron Kid
 Trapp Family Story
 Arcadia of My Youth: Endless Orbit SSX
 Kamen Rider Dragon Knight
 Kirarin Revolution
 Hiwou War Chronicles
 Dino Squad
 Lupin III
 Lupin III Part III
 Fievel's American Tails
 Lucy of the Southern Rainbow
 Wakakusa no Charlotte
 Magical Emi, the Magic Star
 Cattivik
 Idaten Jump
 Diabolik
 Jungle Book Shōnen Mowgli
 Once Upon a Time... Man
 Once Upon a Time... Life
 Once Upon a Time... The Explorers
 Once Upon a Time... The Discoverers
 Once Upon a Time... Planet Earth
 Little Pollon
 Black Jack
 Ronin Warriors
 Clamp School Detectives
 Shin Megami Tensei: Devil Children
 Fancy Lala
 Mirmo!
 Mushiking: King of the Beetles
 Pat & Stan
 Aim for the Ace!
 Johan and Peewit
 Gadget and the Gadgetinis
 Strawberry Shortcake
 Lalabel, The Magical Girl
 Hungry Heart: Wild Striker
 Emma
 Mizuiro Jidai
 Slayers
 The Swiss Family Robinson: Flone of the Mysterious Island
 Jura Tripper
 Gladiators Academy
 Future GPX Cyber Formula
 Gaiking: Legend of Daiku-Maryu
 Oggy and the Cockroaches
 Space Goofs
 Les Misérables: Shōjo Cosette
 Pururun! Shizuku-chan
 Pippi Longstocking
 Katri, Girl of the Meadows
 Porphy no Nagai Tabi
 Don Chuck Monogatari
 Floral Magician Mary Bell
 Project ARMS
 Georgie!
 King Arthur and the Knights of the Round Table
 Boys Over Flowers
 Nana the Supergirl
 Secret of Cerulean Sand
 Bakusō Kyōdai Let's & Go!!
 Animal Yokochō
 Lulu, The Flower Angel
 Esper Mami
 Mobile Suit Gundam
 The Story of Pollyanna, Girl of Love
 Spider Riders
 Little Women
 Little Women II: Jo's Boys
 The Bush Baby
 Dr. Zitbag's Transylvania Pet Shop
 Grimm's Fairy Tale Classics
 My Daddy Long Legs
 Attacker You!
 Little Memole
 Romeo's Blue Skies
 Little Lord Fauntleroy
 Wan Wan Celeb Soreyuke! Tetsunoshin
 Nurse Angel Ririka SOS
 Rascal the Raccoon
 Shin Hakkenden
 Papyrus
 Jungle Emperor
 MÄR
 Record of Lodoss War
 Story of the Alps: My Annette
 Sugar Sugar Rune
 Brain Adventure Record Webdiver
 Zoids
 Lady Oscar
 Viva Piñata
 Kodomo no Omocha
 Hime-chan's Ribbon
 Simsala Grimm
 Tico of the Seven Seas
 Magic Knight Rayearth

External links
 Official page on Mediaset website
 

Mediaset television channels
Television channels and stations established in 2008
Television channels and stations disestablished in 2011
Defunct television channels in Italy
2008 establishments in Italy
2011 disestablishments in Italy
Children's television networks